MTV Party To Go volume 4 was the fourth album in the MTV Party To Go series.  The album was certified gold on May 25, 1994 by the RIAA.

Track listing
 "Give It Away" (12" Mix) – Red Hot Chili Peppers
 "Baby-Baby-Baby" (Full Length Mix) – TLC
 "My Lovin' (You're Never Gonna Get It)" (Theo's Cheaptrick Mix) – En Vogue
 "Hip Hop Hooray" (Extended Mix) – Naughty by Nature
 "They Want EFX" (Remix) – Das EFX
 "Back to the Hotel" (Radio Remix) – N2Deep
 "Jump" (Supercat Mix) – Kris Kross
 "Rhythm Is a Dancer" (Purple Haze Mix) – Snap!
 "Supermodel (You Better Work)" (Couture Mix) – RuPaul
 "Please Don’t Go" (Sunshine Mix) – KWS

References

MTV series albums
1993 compilation albums
Tommy Boy Records compilation albums